The Broken Hearted Bride is the 17th studio album by English band Strawbs.

Reception

Track listing

"The Call to Action" (Dave Cousins) – 7:38
"Christmas Cheer (Everything's Going to be Alright)" (Cousins, Chas Cronk) – 4:39
"Too Many Angels" (Cousins, Cronk) – 5:55
"The Broken Hearted Bride" (Cousins) – 5:11
"Shadowland" (Dave Lambert) – 4:48
"Through Aphrodite's Eyes" (Cousins, Cronk) – 7:26
"Deep in the Darkest Night" (Cousins) – 4:38
"You Know as Well as I" (Lambert) – 3:44
"Everybody Knows" (Cronk) – 4:30
"Action Replay" (Cousins) – 4:54
"We'll Meet Again Sometime" (Cousins) – 6:02

Personnel
Strawbs
Dave Cousins – lead vocals, backing vocals, guitar, keyboards
Dave Lambert – lead vocals, backing vocals, guitar
Chas Cronk – backing vocals, bass guitar, guitar, keyboards, programming
Rod Coombes – drums

Additional personnel
John Hawken – keyboards
Ian Cutler – fiddle
The Big Deal Choir – vocals
Steve Grant
Vince Martyn
Gordon May
Chris Tophill
Howard Werth
Sophie Morish
Charlotte Tophill
Elizabeth Tophill
Frances Tophill

Release history

References

External links
The Broken Hearted Bride on Strawbsweb

Strawbs albums
2008 albums
Albums produced by Chris Tsangarides